Season 8 Favorite Performances is a compilation album by American singer Adam Lambert based on his American Idol performances. The album was released digitally through iTunes and consists of studio recordings made by Lambert during season 8 of American Idol. It does not include live performances at the Nokia Theater in Los Angeles. A similar album was also released through iTunes by season 8 winner Kris Allen. It sold 16,000 on its first week, and has sold 35,000 by July 23, 2009.

Background
This digital-only album is a collection of studio recordings of songs performed on American Idol by Adam Lambert. Starting from Top 13 of the final rounds of the competition, each contestant recorded a studio version of the song that they had performed live on stage. These recordings were released immediately after the result show each week and made available for download exclusively via iTunes.  No sales information however were released for the recordings so as not to prejudice the competition.  At the end of the season, a collection of these recordings were made available as separate albums for both the winner and the runner-up, namely Kris Allen and Adam Lambert. These albums were made available immediately after the season finale on May 20, 2009.

This album contains studio versions of some live performances by Adam Lambert such as "Mad World", "Tracks of My Tears", and "Ring of Fire".  Adam's version of "Mad World" is based on Gary Jules' interpretation of the Tears for Fears' song from the film Donnie Darko.  Gary Jules himself praised Adam's performance of "Mad World", that he had delivered the song "in a unique and beautiful way". His "Ring of Fire" is a further elaboration of Dilana's version of the Johnny Cash song, while his "Feeling Good" was inspired by Muse's version of the song.

Track listing

Charts

Chart performance and sales of individual album tracks
No chart position and sales information were released during the competition, therefore these figures are only for sales and chart positions attained after the finale.

References

Adam Lambert albums
2009 albums
ITunes-exclusive releases
American Idol albums